Waterborne is a 2005 independent film directed by Ben Rekhi and starring Christopher Masterson, Ajay Naidu, Jake Muxworthy, Jon Gries, Christopher Berry, Shabana Azmi and Mageina Tovah. The plot concerns the fates of three different groups of people after a terrorist attack pollutes the water supply of Los Angeles, resulting in a severe water shortage. The score was written and performed by Dredg.

It was the first feature film available for purchase on at the Google video store and won the Special Audience Award at the SXSW Film Festival in 2005.

Cast
Christopher Masterson	 ... 	Zach
Jake Muxworthy	... 	Bodi
Jon Gries	... 	Ritter
Christopher Berry	... 	Carlton (as Chris Berry)
Ajay Naidu	... 	Vikram Bhatti
Mageina Tovah	... 	Lillian
Shabana Azmi	... 	Heera Bhatti
Lindsay Price	... 	Jasmine
Clara Smyth	... 	Clara
Noah Segan	... 	Donovan
Jenna Dewan	... 	Devi
Sarabjit Singh Kaloti	... 	Gulu
Al Sapienza	... 	Connors
Don Swayze	... 	Otis
Bubba Da Skitso	... 	Pat
David Parry	... 	Daniel Polowski
Leanne Suter	... 	Jenna Constans
Anthony Reynolds	... 	Lt. Strauss
Chase Mallen	... 	Maren
Charlie Talbert	... 	George
Fidel Gomez	... 	Natty Dread
Teren Greathouse	... 	Gabe
Lee Cherry	... 	Xavier
Zach Selwyn	... 	John Davidson
Dino Campanella	... 	Looter #1
Nikki Sinai	... 	Looter #2
Helen Kumari	... 	News Reporter
Amy Powell	... 	News Reporter

Reception
Waterborne has an overall approval rating of 100% on Rotten Tomatoes.

References

External links
 

2005 films
2005 drama films
American independent films
2005 independent films
2000s disaster films
American disaster films
2000s English-language films
2000s American films